, also known as Children of Darkness, is a 2008 Japanese crime film written and directed by Junji Sakamoto based upon the book by the same name by Yang Sok-il. The film premiered on August 2, 2008 in Japan and stars Yōsuke Eguchi, Aoi Miyazaki and Satoshi Tsumabuki. Due to its content, Bangkok International Film Festival pulled Children of the Dark from its 2008 film lineup, stating that it was “not appropriate for Thai society.”

Cast 

 Yōsuke Eguchi as Hiroyuki Nanbu
 Aoi Miyazaki as Keiko Otowa
 Satoshi Tsumabuki as Hiroaki Yoda
 Kōichi Satō as Katsuhito Kajikawa
 Sawa Suzuki as Mineko Kajikawa
 Kosuke Toyohara as Tetsuo Shimizu
 Prima Ratchata as Napapom
 Setanan Homyamyen as Aranya
 Thanayong Wongtrakun

Production
Filming for Children of the Dark took place in Bangkok despite initial problems securing a filming permit for Thailand, who denied Sakamoto's attempts to procure one. Actor Yōsuke Eguchi had some difficulties with the script, as he did not speak Thai and did not have enough time to learn beyond a few basic words in the language. As a result, Eguchi had to learn the script phonetically, and he wrote the each script line's pronunciation in katakana before memorizing the lines. After completing the film, Eguchi stated that he began to see things "deeper", as he "saw slums nestled among high-rise buildings in Bangkok, where wealth exists alongside the poor and vulnerable."

Children of the Dark was initially accepted into the Bangkok International Film Festival, who intended to show the film at their 2008 festival, only for festival sponsors Tourism Authority of Thailand and the Federation of National Film Association to pull the film after learning of the movie's content. Sakamoto offered to edit the film in order for it to be shown, only for the festival programmers to decline as they wanted the movie to remain uncut.

Reception 
The Japan Times gave the film three out of five stars, questioning Sakamoto's decision to insert a twist in the film's ending as they felt that it was the "one false note in Sakamoto’s strongest, bravest and most debate-worthy film in years." Richard Kuipers of Variety gave Children of the Dark a positive review, and described it as "a compelling, disturbing thriller set in the twilight world of child prostitution in Thailand."

References

External links 

 
 Official site

2008 films
2000s Japanese-language films
Thai-language films
2008 crime drama films
2008 crime thriller films
Films directed by Junji Sakamoto
Films scored by Taro Iwashiro
Japanese crime drama films
Japanese crime thriller films
Films about pedophilia
Films based on Japanese novels
2000s Japanese films